Darren James Cross, previously known as Darren E. Spielberg-Cross, is an Australian songwriter, musician, record producer and video maker. Cross is the founding mainstay lead vocalist and guitarist of alternative rock group Gerling (1992–2007). He started the E.L.F. project in 2007, which issued an album, Plankton Icke and Tina Turner David City Limits (2010). His folk noir duo Jep and Dep were formed in 2012 with his domestic partner, Jessica Cassar on co-lead vocals, which have issued two albums. Under his own name he has release four studio albums, _Xantastic (2016), Peacer (2018), Keeping Up? (2020) and Distorder (2021). The artist's instrumental folk guitar project, D.C Cross has released three albums, Ecstatic Racquet (2019), Terabithian (2020) and Hot-wire the Lay-low (Australian escapist pieces for guitar) (2022).

Cross has collaborated with other artists, the Apartments, Kylie Minogue, the Avalanches, Jagwar Ma and Kool Keith. The musician has worked in diverse genres from commercial house music, indie rock-style detuned guitar pop, abstract electronica with Gerling to Americana-style traditional folk music. Cross has a music and video production studio, Bernstein studios and performs live in Jep and Dep and as Darren Cross or D.C Cross.

Career

Gerling (1991–2007)

Darren James Cross, as Darren E. Spielberg-Cross, on lead vocals, guitar and synthesiser founded the Australian alternative rock group, Gerling, in 1993. He had attended secondary school in the western suburbs of Sydney, at the height of grunge. Other founders were Presser (a.k.a. Paul Towner) on drums and Brad Herdson on guitar and vocals. Gerling's early music was influenced by Pavement, Sonic Youth, Boredoms, Beck and Mercury Rev; writing with two guitars and drums. The group provided experimental guitar pop, on their debut single, "Sedatives for Dead Radars" (1995) via Steve Pavlovic's Fellaheen Records label.

They followed with an extended play, A Day of Research (1996). Their repertoire moved towards dance music and sampling. Gerling released four studio albums, Children of Telepathic Experiences (February 1998), When Young Terrorists Chase the Sun (September 2001), Bad Blood!!! (2003) and 4 (March 2006). The band toured Australia extensively, and also toured the United Kingdom gaining positive reviews in NME, Japan and New Zealand. In 1999 Cross, Tim Everist and Rhys Lee formed Schwipe, a T-shirt label.

Guest vocalists on When Young Terrorists Chase the Sun were Kylie Minogue on "G-House Prokect", Kool Keith on "Brother Keith on Destructor Mountain (4001)", Solex on "Windmills and Birdbaths" and Inga Liljeström on "Dust Me Selecta". Bad Blood!! was more in the dance and electronica genres due to use of sampled programmed drums, vocoders and computer plugins and distortion. Gerling went into hiatus by 2008. According to Cross, he wrote lyrics for 26 out-of 57 Gerling songs. Cross and Presser, created the group's album artworks and collages, as the Deli Bros/Deli Brothers.

The E.L.F. (2007–2012) 

After Gerling announced an indefinite hiatus in 2007, Cross began working as the E.L.F., providing dance and electronica material. The E.L.F.'s debut extended play, Stevie Nicks Hearts (2008), was recorded at his home studio in Sydney. It was issued on his own label, Oak Records. He released a second EP, Sunray in the Rave Cave (2008) and an album Plankton Icke and Tina Turner David City Limits (late 2010). The album received 9.2 out-of 10 from Jonny of Polaroids of Androids. Cross performed, produced and wrote all material himself; he also toured and DJed throughout Australia. His track "Cockroaches" was played on Triple J and its music video had nearly 250000 hits.

In March 2010 Cross on lead guitar and vocals formed the pop rock trio, Betty Airs in Sydney with Christian Campano on lead vocals, maracas and tambourine, and Michael Zagoridis on drums. They issued a single, "Reverse Now", via Cross' label Oak Records. Cross also produced the work at his E.L.F. Porta-Studios in July of that year. Triple J's reviewer, Richard Kingsmill rated "Reverse Now" at four-out-of-five and exalted, "Nice one Darren - still fighting the good fight. I like the mix of influences coming through in this." Drew Larringfort of Rave Review caught their performance at Adelaide's Ed Castle, "[their] chemistry was incredible, feeding off each other with comical stage banter, joking with the 'hipsters' in the crowd and having a good old fashioned fun time." By 2011 they had expanded to a four-piece with Patrick Matthews on bass guitar. This line-up issued an EP, Creepin' It Real, by April of that year.

Jep and Dep (2012–present) 

In 2012 Cross started a folk-noir duo with his domestic partner, Jessica Cassar on co-lead vocals, Jep and Dep. They are often compared to Lee Hazlewood / Nancy Sinatra and Nick Cave and Kylie Minogue on Murder Ballads, with The Sydney Morning Heralds Jeff Apter stating, "ballads with the right balance of creeping menace and painful regret." In late 2014 the duo independently released their debut album, Word Got Out, which received 4 out-of 5 stars in reviews at Rolling Stone Australia, and The Sydney Morning Herald. The duo adopt a film noir-aesthetic for their music videos, photographs and artwork and perform live with Cross on acoustic guitar and both on vocals. They supported Johnny Marr (the Smiths), Jessica Pratt, Mirel Wagner, Courtney Barnett, Kristin Hersh from Throwing Muses, Gruff Rhys from Super Furry Animals and Blackeyed Susans. Cross produced Word Got Out at his Bernstein Studios.

Solo work (2012–present) 

Cross, under his own name, released two independent folk, Americana EPs, Freak Out Inn III (April 2013) and No Damage (2014). He wrote, performed, produced the recordings; he also made the related artwork and most of the music videos himself. Cross co-wrote "That Loneliness" on Jagwar Ma's debut album Howlin (2013) with the band's Jonathan Ma and Gabriel Navidzadeh (a.k.a. Gabriel Winterfield). He issued a single, "And the New York Rain Came Down" in December 2014.

Cross described his debut album, _Xantastic (9 September 2016) (pronounced: ZAN-tas-tic) as "probably the closest thing I have done that would be a come close to a Gerling album… " Cross wrote, recorded, produced all of the music at his Bernstein Studios, Sydney. It was released via his own independent record label, No Drums Records for the Australian market. The label Rockers Die Younger issued it on vinyl in France in January 2017.

Apter determined it is "an intriguing album... [with a] dark and stark mood." Rhythmns magazine's Chris Familton  said "melancholy, plaintiff and downbeat in the vein of Nick Drake, Beck, Neil Young and Bill Callahan – yet he has found clever and unobtrusive ways to incorporate samples, synths, drum machines and effects that add a dystopian, sci-fi quality to the music". Rolling Stone Australia's Jonny Nail reviewed its track, "Highway Lights in the Night" and felt it is a "nostalgic synth-folk tilt, with his lonesome vocals, unmistakably his own."

Cross released his second solo album, Peacer, via No Drum in August 2018. Described as the bastian of a modern polymathic D.I.Y artist: writing, recording, performing and producing the album himself at his Bernstein Studios. Special guests on the album include R. Stevie Moore and Cassar from Jep and Dep. 4ZZZ radio's Jade Rodrigo described it as, "a crazy mix of dream pop, retro pop, indie-folk and avant pop, but somehow it cohesively comes together to deliver a cracker of an album." The album jumps between anarchic gospel-krautrock-indie guitar pop tunes to neo-folk fingerpicking spaced out meltdowns.

Keeping Up? (2020) is the first purely electronic album for Cross since 2008. He used an obsolete drum machine, computer and operating system. Tyler Jenke from Rolling Stone Australia gave the album 4.5 stars out of 5 and explained, "blissful ocean of nostalgia, with hazy instrumentation, vocoded vocals, and echoed drumbeats and electronic blips immersing the listener in a devastatingly unique, yet warmly familiar world of musical euphoria." Doubtful Sounds Chris Familton observed, "There's an overwhelmingly immersive quality to the music. Drug-like, womb-like - that intrinsic memory of holding your breath underwater as a child and feeling at peace in the aquatic cocoon."

With comparisons to Gerling, Cross released his fourth studio album, Distorder, on 19 July 2021 on bandcamp exclusively. Jenke stated "[it's] one which feels like a true breath of fresh air – an escapist's paradise made, fittingly, within Cross’ own studio utopia." Backseat Mafias Arun Kendall gave the album 8.7/10, "[it] is a brilliant expression of our times: discordant, unsettling and at times bleak, but delivered with a swagger and a panache. Cross puts on display his musicianship and creativity, creating something dark and elusive yet touched with a certain element of wry amusement. A panoply of sonic expression, a bitter confection of dissonance but a thoroughly enjoyable and cathartic whole."

D.C Cross: (2019–present) 

Cross began a project as D.C Cross in 2019, by playing steel-string acoustic guitar using an American primitive guitar-style with an Australian feel and sound. His influences include British folk revivalists Bert Jansch, John Fahey, Leo Kottke as well as newer artists, Ryley Walker and Steve Gunn. His first instrumental folk acoustic guitar album as D.C Cross is Ecstatic Racquet. Rhythms magazine said "Finding beauty in small details, despair in others. It's a special thing to be able to create these wordless stories with such lyrical qualities, and in the context of contemporary Australian music this stands as a rare and quite unique album".

During the COVID-19 pandemic, D.C Cross issued his second album, Terabithian (20 April 2020). "Equally parts ambient and instrumental folk guitar influenced by American primitive guitarists, British folk revivalists and 90's new-age ambient music." Tone Deaf's Tyler Jenke observed, "To put it simply though, if you're a fan of instrumental music, Terabithian is ... a record you must experience ... with [i] serving as one of the most mesmerising instrumental releases you'll hear for some time. D.C Cross' Terabithian is a high watermark of instrumental music."

"Stolen Police Vehicle Down the Great Western Highway" was released on 28 April 2021, by D.C Cross. It is an antipodean instrumental guitar track, which was premiered on Radio National's Breakfast. It was the first live music performance on the Australian Broadcasting Corporation (ABC) network in over a year, since the first wave of COVID-19 appeared in Australia.

Cross released his third D.C Cross album Hot-wire the Lay-low (Australian escapist pieces for guitar) (5 February 2022). Once again an instrumental Australian Primitive Guitar album, Folk Radio Uk said "an ace display of solo instrumental guitar music from a player with plenty to say and all the skills to say it..."
The album was written mostly in the Central Tablelands in N.S.W, Backseat Mafia wrote "Cross has released a quiet and evocative album of instrumentals, putting on show his refined and delicate abilities on guitar and ability to capture exquisite senses and feelings of the Australian countryside." The record was mastered by Patrick Klem. On writing the album, Cross stated "Hearing Sonic Youth open tunings (Daydream Nation, Goo, Dirty) when I was a kid also was a  gateway to John Fahey and Nick Drake solo guitar... it all made sense'.

Discography

Studio albums

Darren Cross
_Xantastic (6 July 2016) – No Drums Records, Rockers Die Younger 
Peacer (19 July 2018) – No Drums Records
Keeping Up? (6 November 2020) – No Drums Records 
Distorder (19 July 2021) – No Drums Records

D.C Cross
Ecstatic Racquet (29 August 2019) – No Drums Records 
Terabithian (20 April 2020)
Hot-wire the Lay-low (Australian Escapist Pieces for Guitar) (5 February 2022) – No Drums Records

Extended plays

Betty Airs
 Creepin' It Real (early 2011)

Darren Cross
Freak Out Inn III (13 April 2013)
No Damage (1 August 2014)

References

External links

Darrencross.bandcamp.com

Australian singer-songwriters
Living people
21st-century Australian singers
Gerling members
Year of birth missing (living people)